Albi is a commune and town in the province of Catanzaro in the east southeastern portion of Calabria, Italy.

External links
  

Cities and towns in Calabria
Articles which contain graphical timelines